Gowanda Village Historic District is a historic district located at Gowanda in Cattaraugus County, New York. The district encompasses five early 20th century commercial buildings constructed 1925–1926.  The Neoclassical style structures housed the Gowanda Cooperative Savings and Loan Association, Hollywood Theater, U.S. Post Office, and Gowanda's first department store.

It was listed on the National Register of Historic Places in 1986.

References

Historic districts on the National Register of Historic Places in New York (state)
Neoclassical architecture in New York (state)
Historic districts in Cattaraugus County, New York
National Register of Historic Places in Cattaraugus County, New York